Forcellinia is a genus of mites in the family Acaridae.

Species
 Forcellinia bipunctata Mahunka, 1978
 Forcellinia cortina Ashfaq & Chaudhri, 1984
 Forcellinia diamesa Zakhvatkin
 Forcellinia egyptiaca Eraky, 1998
 Forcellinia faini Delfinado, Baker & Baker, 1989
 Forcellinia galleriella Womersley, 1963
 Forcellinia hauseri Mahunka, 1978
 Forcellinia kasachstanica Umbetalina, 1975
 Forcellinia laesionis Mahunka, 1979
 Forcellinia mystax (Mahunka, 1977)
 Forcellinia rugosus (S. Mahunka, 1979)
 Forcellinia samsinaki (Mahunka, 1962)
 Forcellinia tumulus Sarwar, 2001
 Forcellinia wasmanni (Moniez, 1892)

References

Acaridae